The 2016 Mercedes-Benz Challenge is the sixth season of the Mercedes-Benz Challenge.

Entry list
 CLA AMG Cup drivers compete utilising the Mercedes-Benz CLA AMG while C250 Cup drivers use the Mercedes-Benz C250. All drivers were Brazilian-registered, excepting João Lemos, who raced under Portuguese racing license.

Race calendar and results
All races were held in Brazil.

References

External links
  

Mercedes-Benz Challenge
Mercedes-Benz Challenge seasons